Greatest Hits Volume 1 is the first compilation album by Australian pop rock band Mental As Anything, released in April 1986. Greatest Hits Volume 1 peaked at number 2 on the Australian chart and number 36 in New Zealand .

Reception 

Steve "Spaz" Schnee from AllMusic states: "This collection of singles was a perfect introduction to the Mentals' work up to that point (and what an optimistic title it is, too). Featuring all the recent hits from Fundamental as well as singles dating back to Get Wet, Greatest Hits, Vol. 1 is superb. If it's pure pop you're looking for, look no further than this."

Track listing

Personnel 
 Martin Plaza – lead vocals, guitar
 Greedy Smith – lead vocals, keyboards, harmonica
 Reg Mombassa – guitar, vocals
 Peter O'Doherty – bass, vocals
 Wayne de Lisle – drums

Charts

Release history

References

Mental As Anything albums
1986 compilation albums
CBS Records compilation albums
Compilation albums by Australian artists